CovalX AG is a Zürich, Switzerland-based company which develops and manufactures scientific instrumentation for academic research and industrial use.

Origins

CovalX was founded as CovalX GmbH in November 2005 by Ryan Wenzel, Alexis Nazabal and Urs Matter and was converted in January 2007 to its current AG status to allow additional investors into the company.

In 2011, CovalX founded a wholly owned US subsidiary called CovalX Instruments Incorporated located in the Boston area. They began manufacturing and testing of their equipment as well as sales and support for their hardware products.

The company's products are focused on measuring intact protein complexes by MALDI mass spectrometry. They distribute chemical kits, high mass detection hardware and analysis software.  Since 2009, the company has also begun a growing focus on analytical service measurements through its growing CRO laboratories in Switzerland and France.

Awards 
In April 2006, CovalX received the CTI Start-up Label from the Swiss Confederation's Commission for Technology and Innovation.

References

External links
 Company home page

Biotechnology companies established in 2005
Research support companies
Manufacturing companies based in Zürich
Biotechnology companies of Switzerland
2005 establishments in Switzerland